Erdek Naval Base is a base of the Turkish Navy on the south coast of the Sea of Marmara  south-east of Erdek in Balıkesir Province.  It is the principal base for mine warfare vessels.

Operations 

 1st Minehunter and Minesweeper Flotilla Commodore (1. Arama Tarama Filotillası Komodorluğu)
 2nd Minehunter and Minesweeper Flotilla Commodore (2. Arama Tarama Filotillası Komodorluğu)
 Mine Warfare Support Center Command (Mayın Harbi Destek Merkezi Komutanlığı)

Homeported vessels

1st Minehunter and Minesweeper Flotilla
 A or Aydın class minehunters
 TCG Alanya (M 265)
 TCG Amasra (M 266)
 TCG Ayvalık (M 267)
 TCG Akçakoca (M 268)
 S class minesweepers
 TCG Silifke (M 514)
 TCG Saros (M 515)
 TCG Sığacık (M 516)
 TCG Sapanca (M 517)
 TCG Sarıyer (M 518)

2nd Minehunter and Minesweeper Flotilla
 E or Engin class minehunters
 TCG Edincik (M 260), ex HMS Grecian (J352)
 TCG Edremit (M 261), ex HMS Chance (J340)
 TCG Enez (M 262)
 TCG Erdek (M 263)
 TCG Erdemli (M 264), ex HMS Catherine (J12)
 F class minesweepers
 TCG Foça (M 500)
 TCG Fethiye (M 501)
 TCG Fatsa (M 502), ex HMS Fairy (J403)
 TCG Finike (M 503), ex HMS Gazelle (J342)

References 

Turkish Navy bases
Economy of Balıkesir
Military in Balıkesir
Buildings and structures in Balıkesir Province